

Medalists

Men's events (1984)

Individual C1

Individual C2

Women's events (1984)

Individual C1

Individual C2

Mixed events

Mixed individual C1

Individual C2

Mixed team events (C1-2) 

Medalists
Boccia
Boccia